The Men's double FITA round division 3 was an archery competition at the 1984 Summer Paralympics.

The Norwegian archer, Kjell Løvvold won the gold medal.

Results

References

1984 Summer Paralympics events